Robert Braiden is an Australian film director and writer. Born in Sydney he grew up in Moorebank, Liverpool, New South Wales and now currently lives in Brisbane, Queensland.

After obtaining a Bachelor of Visual Arts in Film and Television Production from Griffith University, Robert went on to work in commercial television on such shows as The Great South East and Big Brother. His writing and directing credits include the short films Nine Miles Beautiful, Falling, True Love, Ink and The Housewife.

True Love won several industry awards including the Kinetone Award for Best Film at the Queensland New Filmmakers Awards, a part of the Brisbane International Film Festival. He was also nominated for Best Director and Best Emerging Talent. The film has since won the Best Film Award at the NYC Picture Start Film Festival in New York City.

Robert won the Best Director award at the 2012 Shorts in Paradise Film Festival on the Gold Coast. True Love won the Best Film award at the same festival.

True Love was paired with the 2013 Academy Award winning short film 'Curfew' for broadcast on KQED Television in California.

Nine Miles Beautiful won several awards including the People’s Choice Award at the Mudfest Film Festival and the Audience Favourite Award at the Brisbane International Film Festival, as well as the People’s Choice Award at the Bondi Film Festival.

In 2017 he directed his first feature film 1, a contemporary drama science fiction about the last person on Earth. The film was shot across south-east Queensland and is currently in post-production.

He has appeared as an actor in the feature films Diamond of Jeru, Inspector Gadget 2, The Great Raid and In Her Skin starring Guy Pearce, Sam Neill and Miranda Otto. He has also appeared in the Australian television series The Sleepover Club.

Filmography (selected)
1 — Writer/Director (2017)
Black Betty — Director (2013)
Ink — Director (2012)
 The Housewife — Director (2012)
 True Love — Director (2010)
 Falling — Director (2007)
 Nine Miles Beautiful — Writer (2007)
 Big Brother — Story Assistant (2006)
 Great South East — Channel 7 — Brisbane Associate Producer (2005)
 My Life Among the Photocopiers — Writer/Director (2004)

References

Australian film directors
1971 births
Living people
Griffith University alumni
Male actors from Sydney
Australian screenwriters
Australian male film actors